Eucalyptus quadricostata, commonly known as the square-fruited ironbark, is a species of small to medium-sized ironbark that is endemic to Queensland. It has rough ironbark on the trunk and branches, lance-shaped to curved adult leaves, flower buds in groups of seven, white flowers and cup-shaped fruit that are square in cross-section.

Description
It has hard, rough, dark grey to black ironbark on the trunk and branches. Flowering has been recorded in January and July and the flowers are white.

Taxonomy
Eucalyptus quadricostata was first formally described in 1985 by Ian Brooker in the journal Austrobaileya from material he collected near "Oakvale H.S.".

Conservation status
This eucalypt is classified as "least concern" under the Queensland Government Nature Conservation Act 1992.

See also
List of Eucalyptus species

References

Trees of Australia
quadricostata
Myrtales of Australia
Flora of Queensland
Taxa named by Ian Brooker
Plants described in 1985